David Sousa Albino (born 4 July 2001), known as David Sousa, is a Brazilian footballer who plays as a central defender for Cercle Brugge, on loan from Botafogo.

Club career
Born in Rio de Janeiro, Sousa joined Botafogo in 2015, after being released by Flamengo. On 18 December 2018, he signed his first professional contract with the club, until July 2022.

Sousa made his first team debut on 18 January 2020, starting in a 0–1 Campeonato Carioca away loss against Volta Redonda. On 8 June, after the departure of Joel Carli, he was definitely promoted to the first team. His Série A debut occurred on 6 September, as he replaced fellow youth graduate Caio Alexandre late into a 2–2 away draw against Corinthians.

On 4 July 2021, Sousa signed a two-year loan deal with Belgian First Division A club Cercle Brugge which included a purchase option.

Career statistics

References

External links
Botafogo profile 

2001 births
Living people
Footballers from Rio de Janeiro (city)
Brazilian footballers
Association football defenders
Campeonato Brasileiro Série A players
Belgian Pro League players
Botafogo de Futebol e Regatas players
Cercle Brugge K.S.V. players
Brazilian expatriate footballers
Expatriate footballers in Belgium
Brazilian expatriate sportspeople in Belgium